Randolph Blake (born 1945) is an American psychologist, currently the Centennial Professor at Vanderbilt University and an Elected Fellow of the American Academy of Arts and Sciences and National Academy of Sciences.

References

1945 births
Living people
Vanderbilt University faculty
20th-century American psychologists
Vanderbilt University alumni
Fellows of the American Academy of Arts and Sciences
Members of the United States National Academy of Sciences
21st-century American psychologists